Banten is the westernmost province on the island of Java, Indonesia. Its capital city is Serang. The province borders West Java and the Special Capital Region of Jakarta on the east, the Java Sea on the north, the Indian Ocean on the south, and the Sunda Strait (which separates Java from the neighbouring island of Sumatra) on the west. It had a population of over 11.9 million in the 2020 census, up from about 10.6 million in 2010. The estimated mid-2022 population was 12.25 million. Formerly part of the province of West Java, Banten was declared a separate province in 2000. The region is the homeland of the Bantenese people, whose culture differs slightly from that of West Java's Sundanese people. The northern half (particularly the areas near Jakarta and the Java Sea coast) has recently experienced rapid rises in population and urbanization, and the southern half (especially the region facing the Indian Ocean) has a more traditional character but an equally fast-rising population.

Present-day Banten was part of the Sundanese Tarumanagara kingdom from the fourth to the seventh centuries AD. After the fall of Tarumanegara, it was controlled by Hindu-Buddhist kingdoms such as the Srivijaya Empire and the Sunda Kingdom. The spread of Islam in the region began in the 15th century; by the late 16th century, Islam had replaced Hinduism and Buddhism as the dominant religion in the province, with the establishment of the Banten Sultanate. European traders began arriving in the regionfirst the Portuguese, followed by the British and the Dutch. The Dutch East India Company (VOC) finally controlled the regional economy, gradually weakening the Banten Sultanate. On 22 November 1808, Dutch Governor-General Herman Willem Daendels declared that the Sultanate of Banten had been absorbed into the Dutch East Indies. This began the Bantam Residency, 150 years of direct Dutch rule. In March 1942, the Japanese invaded the Indies and occupied the region for three years before their August 1945 surrender. The region was returned to Dutch control for the next five years before the Dutch left and it was ruled by the Indonesian government. Banten then became part of the province of West Java, and separatist efforts led to the creation of the province of Banten in 2000.

Banten is diverse, inhabited by many ethnic groups; the most dominant is the Bantenese people. The Sundanese language is the province's lingua franca, although Indonesian is the official language. Javanese is also spoken by many Javanese migrants from Central and East Java. The semi-isolated Baduy people, who speak the Baduy language (an archaic form of Sundanese), live in the Lebak Regency. Most of the population is fluent in Indonesian as a second language.

Etymology 
The name "Banten" has several possible origins. The first is from the Sundanese phrase katiban inten, which means "struck down by diamonds". The phrase comes from the history of the Bantenese people, who were animists before adopting Buddhism and Hinduism. After Islam began to spread in Banten, the community began to recognize and embrace Islam. The spread of Islam in Banten is described as being "struck down by diamonds".

Another origin story is that the Indonesian Hindu god Batara Guru traveled from east to west, arriving at Surasowan (present-day Serang). When he arrived, Batara Guru sat on a stone which became known as watu gilang. The stone glowed, and was presented to the king of Surasowan. Surasowan was reportedly surrounded by a clear, star-like river, and was described as a ring covered with diamonds (Sundanese: ban inten). This evolved into "banten".

Another possibility is that "Banten" comes from the Indonesian word bantahan (rebuttal), because the local Bantenese people resisted the Dutch colonial government. The word "Banten" appeared before the establishment of the Banten Sultanate as the name of a river. The high plains on its banks were called Cibanten Girang, shortened to Banten Girang (Upper Banten). Based on research in Banten Girang, the area has been settled since the 11th and 12th centuries. During the 16th century, the region developed rapidly towards Serang and the northern coast. The coastal area later became the Sultanate of Banten, founded by Sunan Gunung Jati, which controlled almost all of the former Sunda Kingdom in West Java. Sunda Kelapa (Batavia) was captured by the Dutch, and Cirebon and the Parahiyangan region were captured by the Mataram Sultanate. The Banten Sultanate was later converted into a residency by the Dutch.

History

Early history 

During the fifth century, Banten was part of the kingdom of Tarumanagara. The kingdom collapsed after an attack by Srivijaya, and western Java became part of the Sunda Kingdom. In the Chinese Chu-fan-chi, written around 1225, Chou Ju-kua wrote that Srivijaya ruled Sumatra, the Malay peninsula, and western Java during the early 13th century. Chu-fan-chi identified the port of Sunda as strategic and thriving, with pepper from Sunda among the highest quality. The population were made up of farmers, and their houses were built on wooden poles (rumah panggung). Robbery, however, was common.

According to Portuguese explorer Tome Pires, Bantam (Banten) was an important early-16th-century port in the Kingdom of Sunda along with the ports of Pontang, Cheguide (Cigede), Tangaram (Tangerang), Calapa (Sunda Kelapa) and Chimanuk (on the Cimanuk river estuary). In 1527, as the Portuguese fleet arrived off the coast, newly-converted Javanese Muslims under Sunan Gunungjati captured the port of Banten and the surrounding area from the Sundanese and established the Sultanate of Banten. According to Portuguese historian João de Barros, Banten was the center of the sultanate and a major Southeast Asian port (rivaling Malacca and Makassar). It was 850 fathoms in length. A river, navigable by junks, flowed through the center of the town; a small tributary extended to the town's edge. The present-day river is smaller, and only navigable by small boats. A fortress near the town had brick walls seven palms thick. Armed, wooden defence buildings were two stories high. The town square was used for military activities and folk art, with a market in the morning. The palace was on the south side of the square. Next to the palace is a tall, flat-roofed building known as Srimanganti, which was used by the king to meet his subjects. West of the square is the Great Mosque of Banten.

Colonial era 

When the Dutch arrived in Indonesia, the Portuguese had long been in Banten. The English established a factory in Banten, followed by the Dutch. The French and the Danish also came to trade in Banten. In the competition among European traders, the Dutch emerged victorious. The Portuguese left Banten in 1601 after their fleet was destroyed by the Dutch off the coast during the Dutch–Portuguese War.

Although the Dutch won the war, they preserved the Banten Sultanate. The maritime sultanate relied on trade, and the pepper monopoly in Lampung made the Banten authorities intermediaries. The sultanate grew rapidly, becoming a commercial center. As sea trade increased throughout the archipelago, Banten became a multi-ethnic region. Assisted by the British, Danish and Chinese, Banten traded with Persia, India, Siam, Vietnam, the Philippines, China and Japan. The reign of Sultan Ageng Tirtayasa was the sultanate's height. Under his reign, Banten had one of the strongest navies in the region, built to European standards with help from European shipbuilders and attracted Europeans to the sultanate. To secure its shipping lanes, Banten sent its fleet to Sukadana (the present-day Ketapang Regency in West Kalimantan) and conquered it in 1661. Banten also tried to escape the pressure of the Dutch East India Company (VOC), which had blockaded incoming merchant ships.

A power struggle developed around 1680 between Ageng Tirtayasa and his son, Abu Nashar Abdul Qahar (also known as Sultan Haji). The disagreement was exploited by the VOC, who supported Haji and causing a civil war. Strengthening his position, Haji sent two envoys to meet King Charles II of England in London in 1682 to obtain support and weapons. In the ensuing war, Ageng withdrew from his palace to Tirtayasa (present-day Tangerang); on 28 December 1682, the region was seized by Haji with Dutch assistance. Ageng and his other sons, Pangeran Purbaya and Syekh Yusuf from Makassar, retreated to the southern Sunda interior. On 14 March 1683, Sultan Ageng was captured and imprisoned in Batavia.

The VOC continued to pursue and suppress Sultan Ageng's followers, led by Prince Purbaya and Sheikh Yusuf. Heavily outnumbered, Prince Purbaya surrendered. Surapati was ordered by Captain Johan Ruisj to pick up Purbaya and bring him to Batavia. They met with VOC forces led by Willem Kuffeler, but a dispute between them destroyed Kuffeler's forces; Surapati and his followers became fugitives from the VOC.

Lampung was given to the VOC on 12 March 1682 by Sultan Haji as compensation for the company's support, and a 22 August 1682 letter gave the VOC the province's pepper monopoly. The sultanate also had to reimburse the VOC for losses caused by the war. After Sultan Haji's death in 1687, the VOC's influence in the sultanate began to increase; the appointment of a new sultan required the approval of the governor-general in Batavia. Sultan Abu Fadhl Muhammad Yahya ruled for about three years before he was replaced by his brother, Pangeran Adipati (Sultan Abul Mahasin Muhammad Zainul Abidin). The civil war in Banten left instability for the next government, due to dissatisfaction with the VOC's interference in local affairs. Popular resistance peaked again at the end of the reign of Sultan Abul Fathi Muhammad Syifa Zainul Arifin. The sultan sought VOC assistance against the rebellion, and Banten became a vassal state of the company in 1752.

In 1808, at the peak of the Napoleonic Wars, Governor-general Herman Willem Daendels ordered the construction of the Great Post Road to defend Java from British attack. Daendels ordered the sultan of Banten to move his capital to Anyer and provide labor to build a port in Ujung Kulon. The sultan defied Daendels' order, and Daendels ordered an attack on Banten and the destruction of Surosowan Palace. The sultan and his family were held in the palace before their imprisonment in Fort Speelwijk. Sultan Abul Nashar Muhammad Ishaq Zainulmutaqin was then exiled to Batavia. On 22 November 1808, Daendels announced from his Serang headquarters that the sultanate had been absorbed into the Dutch East Indies. The sultanate was abolished in 1813 by the British after the invasion of Java. That year, Sultan Muhammad bin Muhammad Muhyiddin Zainussalihin was disarmed and forced to abdicate by Thomas Stamford Raffles; this ended the sultanate. After the British returned Java to the Dutch in 1814 as part of the Anglo-Dutch Treaty of 1814, Banten became a residentie (residency) of the Dutch East Indies.

Japanese occupation and independence 

Japan invaded the East Indies, expelling the Dutch, and occupied Banten in March 1942. During their three years of occupation, the Japanese built the Saketi–Bayah railway in southern Lebak to transport brown coal from the Bayah mines. The project involved a workforce of about 1,000 rōmusha (local forced labourers) and a few engineers and technicians (mainly Dutch), supervised by the Japanese. The rōmusha working in the mines were taken from Central and East Java, the railway rōmusha were primarily from Banten. The construction took 12 million human days over 14 months. Working conditions were harsh due to food shortages, lack of medical care, and the tropical climate. Casualties are estimated at 20,000 to 60,000, not including mine workers.

After Japan surrendered in August 1945, the Dutch East Indies declared independence as the Republic of Indonesia. This was opposed by the returning Dutch, resulting in the Indonesian war of independence. During the war, Banten remained under Indonesian control. On 26 February 1948, the State of West Java was established; on 24 April 1948, it was renamed Pasundan. Pasundan became a federal state of the United States of Indonesia in 1949, and was incorporated into the Republic of Indonesia on 11 March 1950.

After Indonesian independence, Banten became part of the province of West Java. Separatist sentiment led to the creation of the province of Banten in 2000.

Geography 

Banten lies between 5°7'50" and 7°1'11" south latitude and 105°1'11" and 106°7'12" east longitude.

It is near the Sunda Strait's sea lanes, which link Australia and New Zealand with Southeast Asia. Banten also links Java and Sumatra. The region has a number of industries; its seaports handle overflow cargo from the seaport in Jakarta, and are intended to be an alternative to the Port of Singapore.

Its location on the western tip of Java makes Banten the gateway to Java, Sumatra and the adjacent areas of Jakarta, Indonesia's capital. Bordering the Java Sea on the north, the Sunda Strait on the west and the Indian Ocean on the south, the province has abundant marine resources.

Topography 

Banten is primarily lowland (below 50 metres above sea level) in Cilegon, Tangerang, Pandeglang Regency, and most of Serang Regency.

Banten's geomorphology generally consists of lowlands and sloping and steep hills. The lowlands are generally in the north and south.

The southern Pandeglang Regency is also hilly. In eastern Lebak Regency, bordering Bogor Regency and Sukabumi Regency in West Java, most of the region consists of steep hills of old sedimentary rock interspersed with igneous rocks such as granite, granodiorite, diorite and andesite. It also contains valuable tin and copper deposits.

Climate 

Banten's climate is influenced by the South and East Asian Monsoons and the alternating La Niña or El Niño. During the rainy season, the weather is dominated by a west wind (from Sumatra and the Indian Ocean south of the Indian subcontinent) joined by winds from Northern Asia crossing the South China Sea. The dry season is dominated by an east wind which gives Banten severe droughts, especially on the northern coast during El Niño.

The heaviest rainfall ranges from  during the rainy season from September to May, covering half of the western Pandeglang Regency. Rainfall from  covers half of Tangerang Regency, the northern Serang Regency, and the cities of Cilegon and Tangerang. In the dry season (from April to December), the peak rainfall of  covers half of the northern Serang and Tangerang Regencies and the cities of Cilegon and Tangerang. The lowest dry-season rainfall,  from June to September, covers half of the southern Tangerang Regency and 15 percent of southeastern Serang Regency.

Administrative divisions 

Banten consists of four regencies (kabupaten) and four autonomous cities (kota), listed below with their populations in the 2010 and 2020 censuses and in official mid-2022 estimates. The cities and regencies are subdivided into 140 districts, 262 urban villages and 1,242 villages.

Regency capitals 
Tangerang was incorporated as a city on 27 February 1993 from the Tangerang Regency, of which it had been the administrative capital. It was replaced by Cipasera. Cilegon was incorporated as a city on 20 April 1999 from the Serang Regency, of which it had been the administrative capital. It was replaced by Serang. Serang was incorporated as a city on 17 July 2007 from the Serang Regency, of which it had been the administrative capital. It was replaced by Ciruas. South Tangerang (formerly Cipasera) was incorporated as a city on 29 October 2008 from the Tangerang Regency, of which it had been the administrative capital. It was replaced by Tigaraksa.

Demographics 

The 2006 population of Banten was 9,351,470, with 3,370,182 children (36.04 percent), 240,742 elderly people (2.57 percent), and the remaining 5,740,546 people aged between 15 and 64. It was Indonesia's fifth-most-populous province, after West Java, East Java, Central Java and North Sumatra. By mid-2022, the estimated total had risen to 12,251,985.

Ethnic groups 

The Bantenese people are the largest group in the province, forming 47% of the total population. They mostly inhabit the central and southern part of the province. The origins of the Bantenese people; which are closely related to the Banten Sultanate, are different from the Cirebonese people whom are not part of the Sundanese people nor the Javanese people (unless it is from the result of a mixture of two major cultures, namely Sundanese and Javanese). The Bantenese people along with the Baduy people (Kanekes) are essentially a subdivision of the Sundanese people which occupies the former region of the Banten Sultanate (region of Bantam Residency after the abolishment and annexation by the Dutch East Indies). Only after the formation of the Banten Province did people began to regard the Bantenese as a group of people with a culture and language of their own.

Most of the north Banten population is Javanese. Most of the Javanese are migrants from central and eastern Java. The Betawi people live in greater Jakarta, including Tangerang. Chinese Indonesians may also be found in urban areas, also primarily in the greater Jakarta area. The Benteng Chinese (a subgroup of Chinese Indonesians) lives in Tangerang and the surrounding area, and are distinct from other Chinese Indonesians.

Languages 

The province's dominant language is Sundanese. Its indigenous people speak a dialect derived from archaic Sundanese, classified as informal in modern Sundanese.

The Mataram Sultanate tried to control West Java, including Banten; the Sultanate of Banten defended its territory except for Banten. In the mountains and most of present-day Banten, the "loma" version of the Sundanese language is dominant; this version is considered "harsh" by people from Parahyangan. Bantenese is commonly spoken, especially in the southern Pandeglang and Lebak Regencies. Near Serang and Cilegon, the Javanese Banyumasan dialect is spoken by about 500,000 people. In northern Tangerang, Betawi is spoken by Betawi immigrants. Indonesian is also widely spoken, especially by urban migrants from other parts of Indonesia. The Baduy people speak the Baduy language, also an archaic form of Sundanese.

Religion 

Most residents are Muslims, and the Banten Sultanate was one of the largest Islamic kingdoms on the island of Java. The province also has other ethnicities and religions, including the Benteng Chinese community in Tangerang and the Baduy people who practice Sunda Wiwitan in Kanekes, Leuwidamar, Lebak Regency.

Based on archaeological data, early Banten society was influenced by the Hindu-Buddhist Tarumanagara, Sriwijaya and Sunda Kingdoms. According to the Babad Banten, Sunan Gunung Jati and Maulana Hasanuddin spread Islam extensively in the region. Maulana Yusuf reportedly engaged in da'wah in the interior, and conquered Pakuan Pajajaran.

The sultan of Banten's genealogy reportedly traced back to Muhammad, and the ulamas were influential. Tariqa Sufism developed in the region.

Culture 

Banten's culture is based on Hinduism, Buddhism and Islam. Religious sites include the Great Mosque of Banten and the Keramat Panjang Tomb.

The Baduy people live in central and southern Banten. The Inner Baduy tribes are native Sundanese who are opposed to modernization in dress and lifestyle, and the Outer Baduy tribes are more open to modernization. The Baduy-Rawayan tribe lives in the Kendeng Cultural Heritage Mountains, an area of  spanning the Kanekes area, Leuwidamar District, Lebak Regency. Baduy villages are generally located on the Ciujung River in the Kendeng Mountains.

Weapons 
The golok, similar to a machete, is Banten's traditional weapon. Formerly a self-defence weapon, it is now a martial-arts tool. The Baduy people use goloks for farming and forest hunting. Other traditional weapons include the kujang, kris, spear, sledgehammer, machete, sword and bow and arrow.

Traditional housing 
Traditional housing in Banten has thatched roofing, with floors made of split and pounded bamboo. This type of traditional house is still widely found in areas inhabited by the Kanekes and Baduy peoples.

Clothing 
Bantenese men traditionally wear closed-neck shirts and trousers belted with batik, perhaps with a golok tucked into the belt. Bantenese women traditionally wear a kebaya, decorated with a hand-crafted brooch at the waist. Hair is tied into a bun, and decorated with a flower.

Islamic architecture 
Three-level mosque architecture is symbolic of tariqa ihsan (beauty) and sharia (law).

Pencak silat 

Pencak silat is a group of martial arts, rooted in Indonesian culture, which reportedly existed throughout the archipelago since the seventh century. It began to be recorded when it was influenced by the ulamas during the spread of Islam in the 15th century. At that time, martial arts were taught with religious studies in pesantren (Islamic boarding schools). Religion and pencak silat became intertwined. Silat evolved from folk dancing, becoming part of the region's defense against invaders.

Banten is known for its warriors, who are proficient in the martial arts. Debus (from ) is a Bantenese martial art which was developed during the 16th century.

Transport 

Banten is in western Java. The province's national roads are congested; provincial roads have less traffic, and congestion is generally localized.

Rail transport is declining; 48 percent of Banten's  rail network was operational in 2005, with an average of 22 passenger trains and 16 freight trains per day. Most lines were single-track, and the main line was the  Merak-Tanah Abang, Tangerang-Duri and Cilegon-Cigading line.

Soekarno–Hatta International Airport is Indonesia's main national airport. Other airports include the general-aviation Pondok Cabe Airport in South Tangerang, Budiarto Airport in Tangerang (for training), and Gorda Airport in Serang (used by the Indonesian Air Force).

Economy 

Banten's 2006 population totaled 9,351,470, with 36.04 percent children, 2.57 percent elderly, and the remainder 15 to 64 years old. The province's 2005 Gross Regional Domestic Product (GDP) was primarily from the manufacturing industry sector (49.75 percent), followed by the trade, hotel and restaurant sector (17.13 percent), transportation and communication (8.58 percent), and agriculture (8.53 percent). Industry had 23.11 percent of jobs, followed by agriculture (21.14 percent), trade (20.84 percent) and transportation and communication  (9.5 percent). The northern part of the province is more economically developed than the southern part.

It is strategically located between Java and Sumatra. Most investment is in Tangerang, South Tangerang and the rest of the north because of their infrastructure and proximity to Jakarta. Infrastructure in southern Banten lags behind that of the north, and Banten's development policies have prioritised growth over equality in Pandeglang and Lebak regencies; investors choose areas with existing infrastructure to ensure competitiveness.

Tourism 

Ujung Kulon National Park is a national park and nature preserve which includes the island of Panaitan. Its highest point is Mount Honje. Species protected in the park include the Javan rhino, deer, antelope, buffalo, several primate species, wild boar, jungle cat, sloth, and several species of birds. It can be reached via Labuan in Pandeglang Regency or by boat. The park has telecommunications networks, electricity, clean water, accommodations, information centers, travel guides, and transportation facilities. In 1991, it became a UNESCO World Heritage Site.

Pulau Dua, covering about  near Serang, is known for its ocean coral, fish and of birds. Between April and August each year, it is visited by about 40,000 birds from 60 species from Australia, Asia and Africa. Originally an island, sedimentation has joined it to mainland Java.

A proposed special economic zone in 2012, the Tanjung Lesung SEZ became operational on 23 February 2015.

Cuisine 

 is a Bantenese food similar to goat or curried rawon. Found in Serang Regency, it is believed to have originated in the Arabian Peninsula and was brought by Arab traders during the spread of Islam in Indonesia. Other Bantenese foods include nasi sumsum (from Serang Regency, made of white rice and buffalo-bone marrow), mahbub, shark fin soup, milkfish and duck satays, duck soup, laksa Tangerang, rice vermicelli, beef jerky and emping.

Sports

Football 
Persita Tangerang (with its home ground at Benteng Taruna Stadium), Cilegon United (with its home ground at Krakatau Steel Stadium) and Perserang Serang (with its home ground at Maulana Yusuf Stadium) represent Banten in Liga 2.

Motorsports 
In 2009, the Lippo Village International Formula Circuit was built in a bid to host the A1 Grand Prix. The series was removed from the schedule, and the track was used for local motorsports before it was dismantled for the Lippo Village expansion; the paddock area was reclaimed by Pelita Harapan University. A replacement street circuit, BSD City Grand Prix, was built in BSD City for local motorsports.

References

Further reading 
 Dinar Boontharm. "The Sultanate of Banten AD 1750-1808: A Social and Cultural History." PhD thesis, University of Hull, 2003.

External links 

 Sekolah dan Daycare Alam Sutera
 Official website 
 Research and Development Agency 
 Informasi Tempat Wisata Di Banten 

 
States and territories established in 2000
2000 establishments in Indonesia
Provinces of Indonesia
2000 establishments in Southeast Asia
Islands of the Indian Ocean
Populated places in Indonesia
Islands of Indonesia